The 2011 Heartland Championship was the sixth edition of the New Zealand provincial rugby union competition, since the 2006 reconstruction. The teams represented the 12 amateur rugby unions.

For 2011, the competition did away with the two round system of previous years. The tournaments' round robin stage saw the 12 teams play 8 games. The teams placing 1st to 4th on the ladder, at the end of the 8 weeks, played off for the Meads Cup. Meanwhile, the teams ranked 5th to 8th played off for the Lochore Cup.

The winner of the Meads Cup received automatic promotion to the Championship, replacing the 7th placed team in the Championship, which was relegated to the Heartland Championship.

2011 Heartland Championship Teams

The 2011 Heartland Championship is being contested by the following teams:

2011 Heartland Championship Table

Round Robin

Week 1

Week 2

Week 3

Week 4

Week 5

Week 6

Week 7

Week 8

Finals

Lochore Cup
Semi-finals

Final

Meads Cup
Semi-finals

Final

Heartland Championship
3
NZ 2